Cheshmeh-ye Ahmad Reza (also Romanized as Cheshmeh-ye Aḩmad Reẕā and Cheshmeh Aḩmad Reẕā; also known as Cheshmeh) is a village in Karvan-e Olya Rural District, Karvan District, Tiran and Karvan County, Isfahan Province, Iran. At the 2006 census, its population was 448, in 132 families.

References 

Populated places in Tiran and Karvan County